Gene Moles (1928-2002) was an American guitarist, active in the pop and surf-music scene of the 1960s.

Early life
Denver Eugene "Gene" Moles Sr., the sixth of seven children, was born on 1 June 1928 in Wetumka, Oklahoma, sixteen miles from Henryetta. His family moved to Selma, just south of Fresno, in 1936. Gene got his first guitar seven years later at age 15.

Musical career
In 1946, Moles joined the house band at the Paris Gardens nightclub in Selma, owned by a woman known as Texas Mom, where he was earning $3 a night. After three years, he moved to Bakersfield, in September 1949, and joined Tex Butler's band that featured pianist George French who were appearing at the Blackboard club. He was getting paid there $10 a night. The regionally successful "Jimmy Thomason Show" on television contibuted to him becoming a local celebrity by 1953. By that time, he had acquired a "solid reputation," which led Capitol Records to engage him from 1959 onwards at their Hollywood studios to work as a session musician. Among the many tracks Moles played in was "Sweet Thing" by Buck Owens, while he also played with Merle Haggard, Red Simpson, Tex Ritter, and many others.

In 1961, Moles and Nokie Edwards of The Ventures co-wrote "Night Run" that was recorded by The Mustangs, "Scratch" by the Surf Coasters, and "Sunny River" by The Ventures.

Guitar expert
Along with his work in music, Moles also worked as chief inspector in the Bakersfield small production-plant of Mosrite guitars. The Mosrites were used by  people like Barbara Mandrell, Little Jimmy Dickens and Joe Maphis, as well as The Ventures who used a Mark-1 mode that  Mosrite, in 1963, named "The Ventures Model." The plant went out of business in 1969 and Moles opened a guitar-repair shop he named "Gene Moles - Doctor of Guitars" and, in 1991, moved to Niles Street. He operated the workshop until the end of his life.

Personal life
Gene and Joan Moles were married in 1956 and had four children: Daughters Cathy Sheer and Marisa Blomberg, and sons Eugene Jr. and Jody. Both sons became guitarists. Eugene Jr., who  lives in Nashville, has played at the Grand Ole Opry and on Hee Haw.

Death
Gene Moles died Sunday 28 April 2002 from pulmonary fibrosis, a progressive lung disease, at his home in Bakersfield, California.

Selected discography

Singles

See also
Dick Dale
Link Wray
List of surf musicians
Drag racing

Notes

References

Further reading

Bibliography

1937 births
2002 deaths
American guitarists
American male guitarists
American people of Lebanese descent
Surf musicians
Lead guitarists
People from Bakersfield, California

20th-century American guitarists
20th-century American male musicians
21st-century American guitarists
21st-century American male musicians